The 2013 season is Aalesunds's 6th consecutive year in Tippeligaen, it was Kjetil Rekdal's fourth full season as the club's manager. Aalesunds competed in the Tippeligaen, finishing 11th  and the 2012 Norwegian Football Cup, where they were knocked out at the Fourth Round stage by Sandefjord. They also competed in the 2012–13 UEFA Europa League qualifying stages, defeating Tirana of Albania in the Second Round and then losing to APOEL of Cyprus in the Third Round.

Squad

Transfers

Winter

In:

Out:

Summer

In:

Out:

Competitions

Tippeligaen

Results summary

Results by round

Results

Table

Norwegian Cup

Europa League

Qualifying phase

Note 1: Tirana played their home match at Qemal Stafa Stadium, Tirana instead of their regular stadium, Selman Stërmasi Stadium, Tirana.

Squad statistics

Appearances and goals

|-
|colspan="14"|Players away from Aalesunds on loan:

|-
|colspan="14"|Players who left Aalesunds during the season:

|}

Goal scorers

Disciplinary record

References

Aalesunds FK seasons
Aalesunds